Common knowledge is a special kind of knowledge for a group of agents. There is common knowledge of p in a group of agents G when all the agents in G know p, they all know that they know p, they all know that they all know that they know p, and so on ad infinitum.

The concept was first introduced in the philosophical literature by David Kellogg Lewis in his study Convention (1969).  The sociologist Morris Friedell defined common knowledge in a 1969 paper.  It was first given a mathematical formulation in a set-theoretical framework by Robert Aumann (1976). Computer scientists grew an interest in the subject of epistemic logic in general – and of common knowledge in particular – starting in the 1980s.  There are numerous puzzles based upon the concept which have been extensively investigated by mathematicians such as John Conway.

The philosopher Stephen Schiffer, in his 1972 book Meaning, independently developed a notion he called "mutual knowledge" which functions quite similarly to Lewis's and Friedel's 1969 "common knowledge". If a trustworthy announcement is made in public, then it becomes common knowledge; However, if it is transmitted to each agent in private, it becomes mutual knowledge but not common knowledge. Even if the fact that "every agent in the group knows p" is transmitted to each agent in private, it is still not common knowledge: . But, if any agent  publicly announces their knowledge of p, then it becomes common knowledge that they know p (viz. ). If every agent publicly announces their knowledge of p, p becomes common knowledge .

Example

Puzzle 

The idea of common knowledge is often introduced by some variant of induction puzzles (e.g. Muddy children puzzle):

On an island, there are k people who have blue eyes, and the rest of the people have green eyes. At the start of the puzzle, no one on the island ever knows their own eye color. By rule, if a person on the island ever discovers they have blue eyes, that person must leave the island at dawn; anyone not making such a discovery always sleeps until after dawn. On the island, each person knows every other person's eye color, there are no reflective surfaces, and there is no communication of eye color.

At some point, an outsider comes to the island, calls together all the people on the island, and makes the following public announcement: "At least one of you has blue eyes". The outsider, furthermore, is known by all to be truthful, and all know that all know this, and so on: it is common knowledge that he is truthful, and thus it becomes common knowledge that there is at least one islander who has blue eyes. The problem: finding the eventual outcome, assuming all persons on the island are completely logical (every participant's knowledge obeys the axiom schemata for epistemic logic) and that this too is common knowledge.

Solution 

The answer is that, on the kth dawn after the announcement, all the blue-eyed people will leave the island.

Proof 
The solution can be seen with an inductive argument. If k = 1 (that is, there is exactly one blue-eyed person), the person will recognize that they alone have blue eyes (by seeing only green eyes in the others) and leave at the first dawn. If k = 2, no one will leave at the first dawn, and the inaction (and the implied lack of knowledge for every agent) is observed by everyone, which then becomes common knowledge as well. The two blue-eyed people, seeing only one person with blue eyes, and that no one left on the first dawn (and thus that k > 1; and also that the other blue-eyed person does not think that everyone except themself are not blue-eyed , so another blue-eyed person ), will leave on the second dawn. Inductively, it can be reasoned that no one will leave at the first k − 1 dawns if and only if there are at least k blue-eyed people. Those with blue eyes, seeing k − 1 blue-eyed people among the others and knowing there must be at least k, will reason that they must have blue eyes and leave.

For k > 1, the outsider is only telling the island citizens what they already know: that there are blue-eyed people among them. However, before this fact is announced, the fact is not common knowledge, but instead mutual knowledge.

For k = 2, it is merely "first-order" knowledge. Each blue-eyed person knows that there is someone with blue eyes, but each blue eyed person does not know that the other blue-eyed person has this same knowledge.

For k = 3, it is "second order" knowledge. Each blue-eyed person knows that a second blue-eyed person knows that a third person has blue eyes, but no one knows that there is a third blue-eyed person with that knowledge, until the outsider makes their statement.

In general: For k > 1, it is "(k − 1)th order" knowledge. Each blue-eyed person knows that a second blue-eyed person knows that a third blue-eyed person knows that.... (repeat for a total of k − 1 levels) a kth person has blue eyes, but no one knows that there is a "kth" blue-eyed person with that knowledge, until the outsider makes his statement. The notion of common knowledge therefore has a palpable effect. Knowing that everyone knows does make a difference. When the outsider's public announcement (a fact already known to all, unless k=1 then the one person with blue eyes would not know until the announcement) becomes common knowledge, the blue-eyed people on this island eventually deduce their status, and leave.

In particular:
  is free (i.e. known prior to the outsider's statement) iff .
 , with a passing day where no one leaves, implies the next day .

Formalization

Modal logic (syntactic characterization) 

Common knowledge can be given a logical definition in multi-modal logic systems in which the modal operators are interpreted epistemically. At the propositional level, such systems are extensions of propositional logic. The extension consists of the introduction of a group G of agents, and of n modal operators Ki (with i = 1, ..., n) with the intended meaning that "agent i knows." Thus Ki  (where  is a formula of the logical calculus) is read "agent i knows ." We can define an operator EG with the intended meaning of "everyone in group G knows" by defining it with the axiom

 

 

There is, however, a complication. The languages of epistemic logic are usually finitary, whereas the axiom above defines common knowledge as an infinite conjunction of formulas, hence not a well-formed formula of the language. To overcome this difficulty, a fixed-point definition of common knowledge can be given. Intuitively, common knowledge is thought of as the fixed point of the "equation" . Here,  is the Aleph-naught.

From this definition it can be seen that if  is common knowledge, then  is also common knowledge. 

This syntactic characterization is given semantic content through so-called Kripke structures. The Kripke semantics for the knowledge operator is given by stipulating that  is true at state s iff  is true at all states t such that .

Set theoretic (semantic characterization) 

Alternatively (yet equivalently) common knowledge can be formalized using set theory (this was the path taken by the Nobel laureate Robert Aumann in his seminal 1976 paper).  Starting with a set of states S.  An event E can then be defined as a subset of the set of states S.  For each agent i, define a partition on S, Pi.  This partition represents the state of knowledge of an agent in a state.  Intuitively, if two states s1 and s2 are elements of the same part of partition of an agent, it means that s1 and s2 are indistinguishable to that agent. In general, in state s, agent i knows that one of the states in Pi(s) obtains, but not which one. (Here Pi(s) denotes the unique element of Pi containing s. This model excludes cases in which agents know things that are not true.)

A knowledge function K can now be defined in the following way:

That is, Ki(e) is the set of states where the agent will know that event e obtains. It is a subset of e.

Similar to the modal logic formulation above,  an operator for the idea that "everyone knows can be defined as e".

Using this we can then define a common knowledge function,

The equivalence with the syntactic approach sketched above can easily be seen: consider an Aumann structure as the one just defined. We can define a correspondent Kripke structure by taking the same space S, accessibility relations  that define the equivalence classes corresponding to the partitions , and a valuation function such that it yields value true to the primitive proposition p in all and only the states s such that , where  is the event of the Aumann structure corresponding to the primitive proposition p. It is not difficult to see that the common knowledge accessibility function  defined in the previous section corresponds to the finest common coarsening of the partitions  for all , which is the finitary characterization of common knowledge also given by Aumann in the 1976 article.

Applications 

Common knowledge was used by David Lewis in his pioneering game-theoretical account of convention. In this sense, common knowledge is a concept still central for linguists and philosophers of language (see Clark 1996) maintaining a Lewisian, conventionalist account of language.

Robert Aumann introduced a set theoretical formulation of common knowledge (theoretically equivalent to the one given above) and proved the so-called agreement theorem through which: if two agents have common prior probability over a certain event, and the posterior probabilities are common knowledge, then such posterior probabilities are equal. A result based on the agreement theorem and proven by Milgrom shows that, given certain conditions on market efficiency and information, speculative trade is impossible.

The concept of common knowledge is central in game theory. For several years it has been thought that the assumption of common knowledge of rationality for the players in the game was fundamental. It turns out (Aumann and Brandenburger 1995) that, in two-player games, common knowledge of rationality is not needed as an epistemic condition for Nash equilibrium strategies.

Computer scientists use languages incorporating epistemic logics (and common knowledge) to reason about distributed systems. Such systems can be based on logics more complicated than simple propositional epistemic logic, see Wooldridge Reasoning about Artificial Agents, 2000 (in which he uses a first-order logic incorporating epistemic and temporal operators) or van der Hoek et al. "Alternating Time Epistemic Logic".

In his 2007 book,  The Stuff of Thought: Language as a Window into Human Nature, Steven Pinker uses the notion of common knowledge to analyze the kind of indirect speech involved in innuendoes.

See also 

 Global game
 Mutual knowledge (logic)
 Pluralistic ignorance
 Stag hunt
 Stephen Schiffer
 Two Generals' Problem for the impossibility of establishing common knowledge over an unreliable channel

Notes 

   See the textbooks Reasoning about knowledge by Fagin, Halpern, Moses and Vardi (1995), and Epistemic Logic for computer science by Meyer and van der Hoek (1995).
   A structurally identical problem is provided by Herbert Gintis (2000); he calls it "The Women of Sevitan".

References

Further reading 

 Aumann, Robert (1976)  "Agreeing to Disagree" Annals of Statistics 4(6): 1236–1239.
 Aumann Robert and Adam Brandenburger (1995) "Epistemic Conditions for Nash Equilibrium" Econometrica 63(5): 1161–1180.
 Clark, Herbert (1996) Using Language, Cambridge University Press 
 .
 Lewis, David (1969) Convention: A Philosophical Study  Oxford: Blackburn. 
 J-J Ch. Meyer and W van der Hoek Epistemic Logic for Computer Science and Artificial Intelligence, volume 41, Cambridge Tracts in Theoretical Computer Science,  Cambridge University Press, 1995. 
 . See Chapter 3.
 . See Section 13.4; downloadable free online.
 Gintis, Herbert (2000) Game Theory Evolving Princeton University Press. 
 Gintis, Herbert (2009) The Bounds of Reason Princeton University Press.

External links 

 
 Prof. Terence Tao's blog post (Feb 2008)
 Carr, Kareem. "In the Long Run We Are All Dead", "In the Long Run We Are All Dead II" at The Twofold Gaze. Detailed description of the blue-eyed islander problem, with solution.
 physics.harvard.edu "Green-eyed Dragons Problem", "Green-eyed Dragons Solution" (Sept 2002)

Game theory
Concepts in logic
Fixed points (mathematics)
Knowledge
Social epistemology
Formal epistemology